Mircea Brînzea (born 25 January 1986 in Bucharest, Romania) is a  Romanian aerobic gymnast. He won three world championships medals (two gold and one silver) and seven European medals (four gold, two silver and one bronze).

References

External links
Federation Internationale de Gymnastique Profiles: Mircea Brînzea

1986 births
Living people
Gymnasts from Bucharest
Romanian aerobic gymnasts
Male aerobic gymnasts
Medalists at the Aerobic Gymnastics World Championships
Competitors at the 2009 World Games
World Games gold medalists
21st-century Romanian people